Mojtame-ye Zanati-ye Rafsanjan (also Romanized as Mojtame`-ye Ẕanʿatī-ye Rafsanjān; also known as Rafsanjān) is a village in Kabutar Khan Rural District, in the Central District of Rafsanjan County, Kerman Province, Iran. At the 2006 census, its population was 37, in 8 families.

References 

Populated places in Rafsanjan County